Sabah Islamic Civilisation Museum is a 2-storey museum building located at Menteri Street in Kota Kinabalu District of Sabah, Malaysia.

History 
The museum opening is officiated by the 8th Yang di-Pertua Negeri of Sabah, Sakaran Dandai on 5 April 2002.

Features 
The museum exhibits the history of the spread of Islamic religion in Southeast Asia including the roots of its arrival into Sabah and Malaysia as a whole. The first ground floor featuring an Islamic World Gallery with ancient Islamic artefacts brought from Middle East countries such as Turkey, Egypt, Iran, Morocco and India. Apart from the Islamic World Gallery, a Borneo Gallery also features in the same floor where dozens of Islamic antique from Sabah and neighbouring Sarawak and Brunei being featured.

See also 
 List of museums in Malaysia

References

External links 
 

Buildings and structures in Kota Kinabalu
Islamic museums in Malaysia
Museums established in 2002
Museums in Sabah